Pectinimura liberalis is a moth in the family Lecithoceridae. It is found in Papua New Guinea.

The length of the forewings is 8–9 mm. The forewings are relatively broad with an obtuse apex, more or less around the termen. The discal stigmata are conspicuous, the second larger than the first one.

References

Moths described in 1954
liberalis